George Marks may refer to:
George Marks (footballer, born 1915) (1915–1998), English association football player
George Marks, 1st Baron Marks (1858–1938)
George Marks (soccer, born 1999), American professional soccer player
George Marks, List of Cold Case characters
George Thomas Marks (1856–1907), businessman and politician in Ontario, Canada
George Harrison Marks (1926–1997), photographer